Sharon Ann Leal is an American actress and singer. She is known for her roles in movies such as Dreamgirls (2006), This Christmas (2007), Why Did I Get Married? (2007), Why Did I Get Married Too? (2010) and her roles on the television shows Legacy, Guiding Light and Boston Public Apple TV ‘’The Negotiator’’.

Early life
Leal was born in Tucson, Arizona. Her mother, Angelita, is Filipina. Her father was an African-American military policeman who broke up with her mother before Sharon was born. Shortly after, her mother married Jesse Leal, a Master Sergeant in the United States Air Force and a police officer at Clark Air Base, Philippines; he legally adopted Sharon.

Career
Leal's career began with the role of Dahlia Crede in the CBS daytime serial Guiding Light.  Later, she joined the Broadway company of Rent. Soon after, she was cast as Mimi for the San Francisco leg of the first national tour of Rent. Leal appeared on the 1999 original cast recording of the Off-Broadway musical Bright Lights, Big City alongside Patrick Wilson and Jesse L. Martin. She also appeared on the 2001 cast recording of Making Tracks.

From 2000 to 2004, Leal starred in the Fox prime time TV series Boston Public. She also had a role in the theatrical release Face the Music. She then appeared in a recurring role in the short-lived NBC series LAX, as the wife of airport co-director, Roger de Souza.

In 2006, she co-starred in the film adaptation of the Broadway musical Dreamgirls as Michelle Morris, Effie White's replacement in the pop group The Dreams, with Beyoncé Knowles, Jennifer Hudson, Eddie Murphy and Jamie Foxx. In 2007, Leal was cast in the Tyler Perry production Why Did I Get Married? and This Christmas. In 2010, she starred in Perry's sequel production Why Did I Get Married Too?. She also portrayed the character Vanessa Lodge in the series Hellcats, until it was cancelled in 2011. In 2013, Leal played the supporting role in the movie 1982, which tells a story of a drug addicted mother and a father's fight to protect his daughter.

Leal appears in seasons 2, 3, 5 and 6 of Supergirl as M'gann M'orzz (Megan in human form).

Personal life
In October 2001, Leal married Bev Land. Their son Kai Miles Land was born in September 2001. The couple divorced in 2009.
Former Guiding Light co-star Yvonna Wright has said that she and Leal are close friends; the two starred together in a community production of Dreamgirls in their hometown.

Filmography

Film and TV Movies

Television

Awards and nominations

References

External links

Actresses from Arizona
African-American actresses
American adoptees
American film actresses
American soap opera actresses
American actresses of Filipino descent
Actresses from Tucson, Arizona
Living people
20th-century American actresses
21st-century American actresses
20th-century African-American women
20th-century African-American people
21st-century African-American women
21st-century African-American people
Year of birth missing (living people)